Edward Bell may refer to:

Sportspeople
 Edward Bell (footballer) (1888–1918), British footballer
 Eddie Bell (halfback) (1931–2009), American football player
 Eddie Bell (wide receiver) (born 1946), former American football wide receiver
 Ed Bell (1921–1990), American football player
 Ted Bell (footballer) (1883–?), English footballer

Others
 Ed Bell (musician) (1905–1960, 1965 or 1966), American Piedmont blues and country blues singer, guitarist and songwriter
 Edward Bell (singer/songwriter) (born 1987), English singer-songwriter
 Edward Bell (artist), British artist
 Edward William Derrington Bell (1824–1879), recipient of the Victoria Cross
 Ennio Balbo (1922–1989), Italian actor sometimes credited as Edward Bell
 Edward Bell (American actor) (born c. 1930s), husband of Esther Williams (until her death)
 Edward Harold Bell (1939–2019), American sex offender and murderer
 Edward Price Bell (1869–1943), American journalist and Nobel Peace Prize nominee
 Edward Ingress Bell, English architect
 Edward Wells Bell (c. 1789–1870), British Army officer
 Eddie Bell (racing driver) in 2014 V8SuperTourer season

See also
 Robert Edward Bell (1918–1992), Canadian physicist